Gladys Anne Lunn (1 June 1908 – 3 January 1988) was an English track and field athlete from Birmingham, England who competed in the 1934 British Empire Games in the 1938 British Empire Games.

Gladys was a member of Birchfield Harriers athletics club.

At the 1934 Empire Games she won the gold medal in the 880 yards event as well as in the javelin throw competition, an unorthodox combination.

Four years later she won the bronze medal in the javelin throw event at the 1938 Empire Games. She also participated in the 220 yards contest but did not start in her semi-final heat.

She was the inaugural winner of the (unofficial) ladies race at the International Cross Country Championships. She was also twice a medallist in the 800 metres at the Women's World Games, taking gold in 1930 before returning for a bronze medal in 1934.

Nationally, she was a ten-time champion at the Women's Amateur Athletic Association Championships. This included three straight 880-yard titles from 1930 to 1932, two 800 m titles, the first ever mile run in 1936 and the following year in 1937, a 1937 javelin title and two cross country titles.

Lunn had two world records ratified by the International Women's Sports Federation (FSFI): 3:04.4 minutes for the 1000 m in 1931 and 3:00.6 minutes over the same distance in 1934. Four of her performances over the mile were later recognised as world best times.

References

commonwealthgames.com results
Rootsweb entry

1908 births
1988 deaths
Sportspeople from Birmingham, West Midlands
English female sprinters
English female middle-distance runners
English female javelin throwers
British female sprinters
British female javelin throwers
Commonwealth Games gold medallists for England
Commonwealth Games bronze medallists for England
Commonwealth Games medallists in athletics
Athletes (track and field) at the 1934 British Empire Games
Athletes (track and field) at the 1938 British Empire Games
International Cross Country Championships winners
Women's World Games medalists
Medallists at the 1934 British Empire Games
Medallists at the 1938 British Empire Games